The 1946 Virginia State Trojans football team was an American football team that represented Virginia State College as a member of the Colored Intercollegiate Athletic Association (CIAA) during the 1946 college football season. In their 13th season under head coach Harry R. Jefferson, the team compiled a 7–2 record (5–2 against CIAA opponents) and outscored all opponents by a total of 134 to 59.

Schedule

References

Virginia State
Virginia State Trojans football seasons
Virginia State Trojans football